Niki Koskinen (born October 2, 1997) is a Finnish professional ice hockey player currently playing for IPK in Mestis.

Koskinen played seven games for KooKoo during the 2017–18 Liiga season and scored no points. He then has loan spells with SaPKo and IPK during the 2018–19 season before joining IPK on a permanent basis on May 3, 2019.

References

External links

1997 births
Living people
Finnish ice hockey left wingers
KooKoo players
Iisalmen Peli-Karhut players
People from Iitti
SaPKo players
Sportspeople from Kymenlaakso